Xingshan County is a county of western Hubei, People's Republic of China. It is under the administration of Yichang Prefecture-level City.

Geography
The county occupies the mountainous north-western corner of Yichang prefecture ("prefecture-level city"), bordering on Badong County in the west and  Shennongjia in the north. The highest mountains within the county are Mount Wanchao ( elevation) and Mount Wanfu.

The county seat is in Gaofu town; this is the location that is simply marked as "Xingshan" on less detailed maps.

Although the county is away from the Yangtze River itself, and most of its land is at high elevations, the construction of the Three Gorges Dam resulted in the flooding of the valley of the Yangtze's tributary Xiang Xi (香溪, "Fragrant Stream"), where many of the county's residents lived. Accordingly, some 20,000 residents had to be relocated from the flooded areas. It is officially part of the Three Gorges Reservoir Region.

Climate

Administrative division
The county is administratively divided into 8 township-level divisions: 6 towns and 2 townships.

Six towns:
Gufu, Zhaojun, Xiakou, Nanyang, Huangliang, Shuiyuesi

Two townships:
Gaoqiao Township, Zhenzi Township

Gallery

Notes

External links

 Xingshan County People's Government 
 Xingshan County People's Government - English version
 Study on the impact of hydroelectric power at the Xiangxi River, ScienceDirect. Retrieved on June 1, 2013.

 
Counties of Hubei
Geography of Yichang